The Annual Professional Performance Review Plan (also known as an APPR) is the process by which New York state teachers and principals are evaluated on a yearly basis.

New York State Education Department requires that each of the 698 public-school entities around the state document, and requires that local board of education have a plan in place for reviewing the merits of each educator in the public school system.

See also
Race to the Top
New York State Education Department
List of school districts in New York

References

External links
Engage NY (official website for initiatives tied to APPRs and RTTT federal funding)

Education in New York (state)
New York State Education Department